The 1908 New Brunswick general election was held on 3 March 1908, to elect 46 members to the 32nd New Brunswick Legislative Assembly, the governing house of the province of New Brunswick, Canada. The election was held before the adoption of party labels.

Of forty-six MLAs, twelve supported the government, thirty-one formed the opposition, and the other two were neutral. The incumbent government of Clifford William Robinson was defeated ousting the Liberals who had been in power since 1883.

References

Further reading
 

1908 elections in Canada
Elections in New Brunswick
1908 in New Brunswick
March 1908 events